The team eventing event, part of the equestrian program at the 2000 Summer Olympics was held from 16 to 19 September 2000 (the dressage was held over two days). The competition was held in the Sydney International Equestrian Centre. In 2000, as in 1996, the team event was a separate event from the individual competition which was held from the 20–22 September. A rider could compete in both competitions (on different horses). This would be the final time to date, that this format of two separate events has been used.  Like all other equestrian events, the eventing competition was mixed gender, with both male and female athletes competing in the same division. Twelve teams, each consisting of between three and four horse and rider pairs, entered the contest.

Medalists

Results

Dressage
Each team consisted of four pairs of horse and rider.  The penalty points of the lowest three pairs were added together to reach the team's penalty points.

Dressage & Cross Country
Each team consisted of four pairs of horse and rider.  The penalty points of the lowest three pairs were added together to reach the team's penalty points.

Dressage, cross country, & jumping (final result)
Each team consisted of four pairs of horse and rider.  The penalty points of the lowest three pairs were added together to reach the team's penalty points.

References

Sources
 Official Report of the 2000 Sydney Summer Olympics available at  https://web.archive.org/web/20060622162855/http://www.la84foundation.org/5va/reports_frmst.htm

Equestrian at the 2000 Summer Olympics